

History 
Delta Airbase is a private airstrip located at the intersection of East Harris Boulevard & Albemarle Road in Charlotte, NC.  The airport, initially called as "Grove Airport", was probably built sometime during 1941 - 1942 (As it was not yet depicted on the May 1941 14M Regional Aeronautical Chart).

The earliest depiction of an airfield at this site was on the August 1942 14M Regional Aeronautical Chart, which depicted "Grove" as a commercial or municipal airport. The airport was still depicted as “Grove” on the 1943 Regional Aeronautical Chart.

At somepoint during 1943-44 the field was renamed "Delta", as that is how it was labeled on the 1944 Regional Aeronautical Chart. “Delta” was depicted as a commercial/municipal airport on the October 1948 Charlotte Sectional Chart.(According to Mr. Jenks Caldwell, Jr., the current owner of Delta Airbase, the airfield was named "Delta" after some people who came from the Mississippi Delta area during World War II and established the airfield to train pilots for the war effort).

Delta Air Base was listed as a private airfield in the 1962 AOPA Airport Directory, with a single 3,100' turf Runway 18/36.

An aerial photo looking northeast at Delta Air Base from the 1963 NC Airport Directory, which depicted at least 22 large piston-engine airliners (DC-3s & DC-4s?) parked tightly together in a separate clearing adjacent to the south side of the field. In the 1960s, Delta Air Base was the home of a bustling aircraft salvage operation.

By the time of the August 1972 Charlotte Sectional Chart, Delta's runway had been lengthened to 4,200'.

The 1982 AOPA Airport Directory described Delta as having a single 4,200' Runway 18/36. A 1985 aerial photo by Paul Cotrufo looking northeast at Delta Air Base.

Sometime before 1996 the runway was shortened and some of the land was used to develop an apartment complex.  This is evidenced by the fact that 1996 USGS topo map, the runway's length has shrunk back to 3,000'. In the 2002 USGS aerial photo of Delta air Base, a shortened portion of the grass runway remained clear, and a large number of hangars still remained standing along the west side of the runway.

Delta Air Base is still listed as an active facility, although, it is now designated a heliport, and the published length of the runway has shrunk again, to only 1,000'.

Delta Air Base still owned by Charlotte Aircraft Corporation, which is still involved with aircraft salvage.

References 
 http://www.airfields-freeman.com/NC/Airfields_NC_Charlotte.htm#delta
 http://www.charlotteaircraft.com
 https://www.faa.gov
 https://www.usgs.gov
 https://web.archive.org/web/20100816213310/http://www.aopa.org/

Airports in North Carolina
Transportation in Charlotte, North Carolina
Buildings and structures in Charlotte, North Carolina